Oceanobacillus kapialis is a bacterium. It is a Gram-positive, rod-shaped, strictly aerobic, spore-forming, moderately halophilic bacterium. The type strain is SSK2-2 (=KCTC 13177 =PCU 300 =TISTR 1858).

References

Further reading
Staley, James T., et al. "Bergey's manual of systematic bacteriology, vol. 3."Williams and Wilkins, Baltimore, MD (1989): 2250–2251.

External links

LPSN
Type strain of Oceanobacillus kapialis at BacDive -  the Bacterial Diversity Metadatabase

Bacillaceae
Bacteria described in 2009